This is a list of hospitals and health care institutions in Ghana.

Ashanti Region

The Ashanti Region has 530 health facilities.  170 of these health facilities are operated by the Ghana Health Service; 71  by missions; 281 by private institutions; and 8 by the Ashanti quasi-government. The Ashanti monarchy operates about 32 percent of all health facilities in the Ashanti Region.

Brong Ahafo Region

Central Region

Eastern Region

Greater Accra Region

Shiloh Medical Center 
Ningo Prampram district- Dangme West Municipal

Northern Region

Upper East Region

Upper West Region

Islamic Hospital
Wa Municipal

Volta Region

Western Region

See also
 National Health Insurance Scheme (Ghana)

References

External links
List of Best Dental Clinics In Ghana Helpinghana.com
Ghana Health Service Official Website
The Health Sector in Ghana - Facts and Figures 2005
Planned Parenthood Association of Ghana - List of HIV/AIDS service providers in Ghana
Christian Health Association of Ghana Annual Report: JUNE 2005 - MAY 2006
Ghana Medical Association Regional List
Ghana Eye Foundation

Ghana
List
Hospitals
Ghana